Schistura fowleriana is a species of stone loach from the genus Schistura. It is found in Thailand. It is considered by some authorities to be a synonym of Schistura sexcauda.

References 

F
Fish described in 1945